Cincinnati v. Discovery Network, Inc., 507 U.S. 410 (1993), was a case in which the Supreme Court of the United States held that a ban by the city of Cincinnati on the distribution of commercial material via news racks violated the First Amendment.

See also
 List of United States Supreme Court cases, volume 507
 Coates v. Cincinnati

References

External links
 

1993 in United States case law
United States Supreme Court cases
United States Supreme Court cases of the Rehnquist Court
United States Free Speech Clause case law
History of Cincinnati